Eddi-Rue McClanahan (February 21, 1934 – June 3, 2010) was an American actress and comedian best known for her roles on television as Vivian Harmon on Maude (1972–78), Aunt Fran Crowley on Mama's Family (1983–84), and Blanche Devereaux on The Golden Girls (1985–92), for which she won an Emmy Award for Outstanding Lead Actress in a Comedy Series in 1987.

Early life
Eddi-Rue McClanahan was born in Healdton, Oklahoma, on February 21, 1934. She was the daughter of Dreda Rheua-Nell ( Medaris), a beautician, and William Edwin "Bill" McClanahan, a building contractor. Her mother's maiden name was reportedly a variation of the Portuguese or Galician surname Medeiros (a derived from the Portuguese word, "medeiro," meaning "a place where shocks of maize are gathered").

She was raised Methodist and was of Irish and Choctaw ancestry. Her Choctaw great-grandfather was named Running Hawk according to her autobiography My First Five Husbands... and the Ones Who Got Away (2007). She grew up in Ardmore, Oklahoma; she graduated from Ardmore High School, where she acted in school plays and won the gold medal in oration. A National Honor Society member, McClanahan earned a Bachelor of Arts degree, cum laude, at the University of Tulsa, where she majored in both German and Theatre, and joined the Kappa Alpha Theta sorority, serving as vice-president.

Career
A life member of the Actors Studio, McClanahan made her professional stage début at Pennsylvania's Erie Playhouse in 1957, in the play Inherit the Wind. She began acting off-Broadway in New York City in 1957, but did not make her Broadway début until 1969, when she portrayed Sally Weber in the original production of John Sebastian and Murray Schisgal's play with music, Jimmy Shine, with Dustin Hoffman in the title role.

Her role as Caroline Johnson on the TV show Another World (from July 1970 to September 1971) brought her notice. Once her role on Another World ended, McClanahan joined the cast of the CBS soap opera Where the Heart Is, in which she played Margaret Jardin. 
In the 1972 episode of All in the Family, "The Bunkers and the Swingers", McClanahan and Vincent Gardenia play a swinging couple who meet the unsuspecting Bunkers. McClanahan first worked with actress Beatrice Arthur on the sitcom Maude (1972–78). Arthur played  Maude Findlay, and McClanahan played Maude's best friend Vivian Cavender, who eventually married Maude's next-door neighbor Dr. Arthur Harmon (played by Conrad Bain).

After Maude, McClanahan starred in Apple Pie, a series created for her by Norman Lear, but which only aired 2 episodes before it was canceled. In an interview, McClanahan said she also did the pilot episode of The Baxters for Norman Lear but told him she did not want to do the series itself. It is unknown if her appearance was in the actual pilot or an unaired pilot, presumably the latter given she is not credited and the show is not attributed to her anywhere. It is also possible she never actually filmed the episode but was just considering it. A script binder entitled The Baxters was discovered many years later to be a part of her personal collection.

On Mama's Family (1983–90), McClanahan portrayed an uptight spinster sister Fran Crowley to Mama Thelma Harper (Vicki Lawrence). Fran was a journalist for the local paper.  Also in the cast was McClanahan's future Golden Girls costar Betty White. McClanahan and White appeared on the first two seasons before the show was canceled by NBC and then retooled for first run syndication.

On The Golden Girls (1985–92) and its short-lived successor The Golden Palace (1992–93), McClanahan portrayed man-crazed Southern belle Blanche Devereaux, owner of the house she lived in and rented out to her three roommates and best friends: Dorothy Zbornak (Beatrice Arthur), Rose Nylund (Betty White), and Sophia Petrillo (Estelle Getty). McClanahan received four Emmy Award nominations for Outstanding Lead Actress in a Comedy Series for her work on the show, winning the award in 1987.

She appeared as a leader of Al-Anon in a 1970s informational film called Slight Drinking Problem, in which Patty Duke played the enabling and eventually self-empowered wife of an alcoholic. In feature films, she appeared in The Rotten Apple (1961) and Walk the Angry Beach (1968). She appeared as Ruth Rempley, the wife of a swinger couple in an episode of All in the Family in 1972.  She appeared in the Walter Matthau-Jack Lemmon comedy Out to Sea (1997).

On television, she appeared as Matilda Joslyn Gage, mother-in-law of L. Frank Baum in the made-for-TV movie The Dreamer of Oz (1990). She made guest appearances on Murder, She Wrote and Newhart. In the early 1990s, McClanahan appeared as Margaret Becker in a trilogy of made-for-television films: Children of the Bride, Baby of the Bride, and Mother of the Bride. She voice-acted in cartoons, voicing Scarlett in the 1997 Fox Christmas special Annabelle's Wish. She played the role of Steve's grandmother in the Blue's Clues video Blue's Big Treasure Hunt (1999). On Spider-Man: The Animated Series, she appeared in the 1994 episode "Doctor Octopus: Armed And Dangerous" as Anastasia Hardy. She played a biology teacher in 1997's Starship Troopers. She voiced the role of Bunny in a 2007 episode of King of the Hill, "Hair Today, Gone Today". In 2009, she appeared in an episode of Law & Order as a woman who had an affair with John F. Kennedy.

On Broadway, McClanahan replaced Tammy Grimes as "The Visitor from New York" (Hannah Warren) in the Neil Simon comedy California Suite from April 4, 1977, until the show closed on July 2 of that same year.

In 2003, she appeared alongside Mark Hamill in the two-hander Six Dance Lessons in Six Weeks at the Coconut Grove Playhouse in Miami.  She chose not to continue with the production and was replaced by Polly Bergen for the Broadway performances.  The same year, she appeared in the musical romantic comedy film The Fighting Temptations as Nancy Stringer, which costarred Cuba Gooding, Jr., Beyoncé Knowles, Mike Epps, and Steve Harvey. On Broadway, she replaced Carole Shelley as Madame Morrible in the musical Wicked on May 31, 2005. She played the role for eight months until January 8, 2006. She was replaced by Carol Kane on January 10, 2006.

Her autobiography, My First Five Husbands ... and the Ones Who Got Away, was released in 2007. In June 2008, The Golden Girls was awarded the 'Pop Culture' award at the Sixth Annual TV Land Awards. McClanahan accepted the award with co-stars Bea Arthur and Betty White. McClanahan's final acting role was in the cable series Sordid Lives on the Logo network, which premiered July 23, 2008, playing Peggy Ingram.

Activism
An animal rights advocate and vegetarian, McClanahan was one of the first celebrity supporters of People for the Ethical Treatment of Animals. She supported Alley Cat Allies, a nonprofit advocacy organization dedicated to transforming communities to protect and improve the lives of cats, and appeared in a public service announcement for the organization in early 2010.

McClanahan was a supporter of gay rights, including advocating for same-sex marriage in the United States. In January 2009, she appeared in the star-studded "Defying Inequality: The Broadway ConcertA Celebrity Benefit for Equal Rights".

Personal life and death
In June 1997, McClanahan was diagnosed with breast cancer, for which she was treated successfully.

On November 14, 2009, she was to be honored for her lifetime achievements at an event, Golden: A Gala Tribute to Rue McClanahan, at the Castro Theatre in San Francisco, California. The event was postponed due to McClanahan's hospitalization. She underwent triple bypass surgery on November 4. It  was reported on January 14, 2010, by Entertainment Tonight, that, while recovering from surgery, the actress had suffered a minor stroke. In March 2010, fellow Golden Girls cast member Betty White reported on The Ellen DeGeneres Show that McClanahan was doing well and that her speech had returned to normal.

McClanahan died on June 3, 2010, at age 76, at NewYork–Presbyterian Hospital after she suffered a brain hemorrhage. After cremation, her ashes were given to her family.
Co-star Betty White told Entertainment Tonight that McClanahan was a "close and dear friend".

McClanahan was survived by her sixth husband, Morrow Wilson (from whom she separated in 2009); her son from her first marriage, Mark Bish (of Austin, Texas); her sister, Melinda Lou McClanahan (of Silver City, New Mexico); and other family including her niece, actress and author Amelia.

No funeral service was held for McClanahan; her family created an official memorial page on Facebook, and memorial services were held during the summer of 2010 in New York and Los Angeles. On June 10, 2010, her New York apartment went on the market for an asking price of $2.25 million.

In February 2017, a Golden Girls–themed eatery named Rue La Rue Cafe, owned by McClanahan's close friend Michael La Rue (who inherited many of the star's personal belongings and in turn decorated the restaurant with them), opened in the Washington Heights section of the New York City borough of Manhattan. However, after less than a year in business, the cafe closed in November 2017.

Awards and nominations

Filmography

Film

Television

References

External links

 
 
 
 
 
 
 
 
 The Official Rue McClanahan Memorial Page on Facebook

1934 births
2010 deaths
People from Carter County, Oklahoma
American Christians
Methodists from Oklahoma
American film actresses
American memoirists
American musical theatre actresses
American soap opera actresses
American stage actresses
American television actresses
American women comedians
American people of Choctaw descent
American people of Irish descent
American LGBT rights activists
Outstanding Performance by a Lead Actress in a Comedy Series Primetime Emmy Award winners
University of Tulsa alumni
20th-century American actresses
21st-century American actresses
California Democrats
New York (state) Democrats
Oklahoma Democrats
Actresses from Oklahoma
Actresses from New York City
Writers from Oklahoma
Writers from New York City
American women memoirists
20th-century American comedians
21st-century American comedians